KQMO is a radio station airing a Regional Mexican format licensed to Shell Knob, Missouri, broadcasting on 97.7 MHz FM.  The station is owned by Falcon Broadcasting, Inc.

References

External links

QMO